Shukla Bose is the founder and CEO of the Parikrma Humanity Foundation, a nonprofit organization that runs English-medium schools for under-privileged children in Bangalore, India.

She volunteered with Mother Teresa at Missionaries of Charity for 7 years. Her career began as a teacher in a convent school in Kolkata, and she later moved on to work at an army school in Bhutan.

She then worked with the Oberoi Group, and afterwards as the Managing Director of Resort Condominiums India (RCI (company)). However, as she approached her mid-30s, she began to question what impact she could make in life. She admits, "by 1997, I was doing something bizarre, looking at obits and writing my own too, trying to understand from other people’s lives what leaves behind an impact."

In 2000, she accepted an offer run a multinational NGO for children, and started their Indian operations. Within two years of applying her leadership and institution-building skills there, she felt inspired to start an NGO of her own.

Shukla Bose spent 26 years in the hospitality industry before giving up her CEO position to begin Parikrma in 2003.

References

External links

 
 Shukla Bose: Teaching one child at a time (TEDIndia 2009)

Social workers
People from Darjeeling
Loreto College, Kolkata alumni
University of Calcutta alumni
Living people
Year of birth missing (living people)
Founders of Indian schools and colleges
Indian women philanthropists
Indian philanthropists
Women educators from West Bengal
Educators from West Bengal
Women educators